The fifty-fifth session of the United Nations General Assembly opened on 5 September 2000 at the UN Headquarters in New York City. The president was former Prime Minister of Finland Harri Holkeri.

Addresses 
In his address to the assembly, Vinci Niel Clodumar, the head of the Nauru Delegation, criticised the Western European and Others Group and advocated for the creation of a new Oceania regional group to include both Australia and New Zealand, as well as the ASEAN member countries, Japan, South Korea and the Pacific island countries. In his speech he mentioned that "the 11 Pacific island countries are drowning in the Asian Group, while Australia and New Zealand...are marooned in the Group of Western European and other States."

References

External links 
Resolutions and Decisions adopted by the General Assembly during its 55th session

55
2000 in international relations
2001 in international relations
2000 in the United Nations
2001 in the United Nations